Rigal is a surname, often but not always of French origin. People with that surname include:

Barry Rigal (born 1958), English-born American bridge player
Georges Rigal (1890–1974), French water polo player and swimmer
Michel Rigal (1914–1978), General Commissioner of the Scouts de France
Pierre Rigal (born 1973), French dancer and choreographer
Atanacio "Tony" Pérez Rigal (born 1942), Cuban-American former professional baseball player and manager
Victor Rigal (1879–1941), French racing driver

French-language surnames